Richard Albert Joynes (16 August 1877 – 1949) was an English professional footballer who made 70 appearances in the Football League playing for Notts County and Leeds City. He also played for Midland League club Newark and Southern League club Brighton & Hove Albion. He played as a right-sided forward. Joynes, born in Grantham, Lincolnshire, played more than 100 games for Brighton & Hove Albion, and was the club's joint top scorer in 1905–06 with just nine goals in all competitions.

References

1877 births
1949 deaths
Date of death missing
People from Grantham
Place of death missing
English footballers
Association football forwards
Brighton & Hove Albion F.C. players
Leeds City F.C. players
English Football League players
Southern Football League players
Newark Town F.C. players
Notts County F.C. players